St John the Evangelist's Church is in the small village of Byley, Cheshire, England.  It is recorded in the National Heritage List for England as a designated Grade II listed building.  It is an active Anglican parish church in the diocese of Chester, the archdeaconry of Chester and the deanery of Middlewich.  Its benefice is combined with that of St Michael and All Angels, Middlewich.  The architectural historian Nikolaus Pevsner regarded it as being "really very beautiful" with a "minimum of motifs, but a maximum of materials".

History

The church was built as a Commissioners' Church in 1847 to a design by J. Matthews. It cost £1,000 (equivalent to £ in ), the Church Building Commission giving a grant of £75 towards this.

Architecture

The church is built in brick and stone with a roof of tiles. Its plan consists of a four-bay nave, a three-bay chancel which is narrower and less lofty than the nave, a north porch and a southeast tower. The tower has a stone parapet and a steep pyramidal roof. On the west end gable is a bellcote.  The organ was built in 1860 by the Imperial Pipe Organ Company.

External features
The churchyard contains the war graves of 18 Commonwealth service personnel of World War II.

See also

List of Commissioners' churches in Northeast and Northwest England
Listed buildings in Byley

References

Further reading

Church of England church buildings in Cheshire
Grade II listed churches in Cheshire
Churches completed in 1846
19th-century Church of England church buildings
Diocese of Chester
Commissioners' church buildings